Wildlife Generation Pro Cycling (UCI Code: WGC), is an American professional cycling team. The squad is registered in the United States as a UCI Continental Team. Wildlife Generation, an American conservation organization, is the title sponsor.

History
Founded as Ikon-Lexus, in 1999, Wildlife Generation Pro Cycling competes on the USA Cycling National Racing Calendar and the UCI America Tour. From 2000 to 2018, Jelly Belly sponsored the team, the longest-running domestic sponsorship. The team rode Focus Bikes, between 2010 and 2013. From 2014 to 2018, the team rode Argon 18 bicycles.

The team's most important victory was the 2013 United States National Road Race Championships when Fred Rodriguez won his record-breaking fourth title.

Notable riders who have competed for the team include Fred Rodriguez, Jeremy Powers, Kiel Reijnen, Phil Gaimon, Mike Friedman, Carter Jones, Serghei Țvetcov, Matthew Lloyd, Ben Wolfe, Lachlan Morton and Curtis White.

Team roster

Major wins

1999
Stage 10 Vuelta a Guatemala, Chris Baldwin 
2001
Stage 4 Tour of the Gila, Mariano Friedick
2002
Stage 1 International Tour de Toona, Jason McCartney
2003
Stage 2 Flèche du Sud, Mark Fitzgerald 
2004
 United States National Criterium Championships, Jonas Carney
Stage 2 Tour de Toona, Doug Ollerenshaw
Stage 4 Redlands Bicycle Classic, Alex Candelario
Stage 6 Cascade Classic, Alex Candelario
Stage 16 International Cycling Classic, Jonas Carney 
2005
International Cycling Classic 
Stages 3 & 15 Danny Pate
Stage 14 Brice Jones
Stage 17 Alex Candelario
2006
Overall  Sea Otter Classic, Matthew Rice
International Cycling Classic 
Stages 16 & 17 Alex Candelario 
Stage 4 Brian Jensen
2007
Overall  Redlands Bicycle Classic,  Andrew Bajadali
Stage 4 Tour of the Gila,  Brice Jones
2008
Stages 3 & 5 Tour of Hainan, Bradly Huff
Stage 3 Tour of Elk Grove,  Bradly Huff
2009
Overall  Tulsa Tough, Bradly Huff
Stages 1 & 2
Mount Washington Hillclimb, Phil Gaimon
Stage 14 International Cycling Classic, Bradly Huff
2010
 Canadian National Road Race Championships, Will Routley
Overall   Tulsa Tough, Bradly Huff
Stages 1 & 2 Bradly Huff
Overall  Tour of Thailand, Kiel Reijnen
Stage 1 Kiel Reijnen
Overall  Tour de Korea, Mike Friedman
Stage 1 Redlands Bicycle Classic, Will Routley
Stage 3 Tour of Hainan, Bradly Huff
2011
Stage 3 Nature Valley Grand Prix, Bernard Van Ulden
Stage 4 Tulsa Tough, Ken Hanson
Stage 9 Tour de Korea, Ken Hanson
2012
 Mexican National Road Race Championships, Luis Enrique Lemus
 Mexican National Under-23 Road Race Championships, Luis Enrique Lemus
Stage 3 Nature Valley Grand Prix, Bradly Huff
2013
 United States National Road Race Championships, Fred Rodriguez
 Mexican National Road Race Championships, Luis Enrique Lemus
Overall  Cascade Cycling Classic, Serghei Tvetcov
Stages 2 & 4 Serghei Tvetcov
Overall  Nature Valley Grand Prix, Serghei Tvetcov
Stage 1 Serghei Tvetcov
Stage 3 Sean Mazich
Stage 2 Sea Otter Classic, Alew Hagmen
2014
Overall  Cascade Cycling Classic, Serghei Tvetcov
Stages 2 (ITT) & 4, Serghei Tvetcov
Stage 3 (ITT) Tour of the Gila, Serghei Tvetcov
Stage 2 Tour de Hokkaido, Luis Enrique Lemus
2016
Overall  Tour of the Gila, Lachlan Morton
Stage 1 Lachlan Morton
Overall  Tour of Utah, Lachlan Morton
Stage 3 Lachlan Morton
Stage 7 Lachlan Morton
Stage 4 Tour de Hokkaido, Lachlan Morton
2017
Stage 3 Colorado Classic, Serghei Tvetcov
2018
Stage 2 Tour de Beauce, Jack Burke
2019
Stage 2 Tour de Hokkaido, Stephen Bassett
2021
Grand Prix Erciyes - Mimar Sinan, Alex Hoehn

References

External links 

 

Cycling teams based in the United States
UCI Continental Teams (America)
Cycling teams established in 1999
1999 establishments in the United States